Anssi Rantanen (born 3 August 1982) is a Finnish professional ice hockey defenceman who currently plays for Ferencvárosi TC of the Erste Liga. He previously played in Liiga for Lukko and TPS.

References

External links

1982 births
Living people
Arystan Temirtau players
DVTK Jegesmedvék players
Ferencvárosi TC (ice hockey) players
Finnish ice hockey defencemen
FoPS players
HC TPS players
Hokki players
Kulager Petropavl players
Lempäälän Kisa players
Lukko players
MHC Martin players
Orlik Opole players
SønderjyskE Ishockey players
Yuzhny Ural Orsk players
People from Punkalaidun
Sportspeople from Pirkanmaa
Finnish expatriate ice hockey players in Hungary
Finnish expatriate ice hockey players in Denmark
Finnish expatriate ice hockey players in Kazakhstan
Finnish expatriate ice hockey players in Slovakia
Finnish expatriate ice hockey players in Russia
Finnish expatriate ice hockey players in Poland